Solfrid Nilsen (born 29 January 1937) is a Norwegian politician for the Progress Party.

She served as a deputy representative to the Parliament of Norway from Sør-Trøndelag during the terms 1989–1993 and 1997–2001. In total she met during 8 days of parliamentary session.

References

1937 births
Living people
Progress Party (Norway) politicians
Deputy members of the Storting
Sør-Trøndelag politicians
Women members of the Storting
Place of birth missing (living people)
20th-century Norwegian women politicians